Chinglen Thiyam (1 March 1950 - 18 June 2020) was an actor, comedian, lyricist and director of Shumang Kumhei theatre in Manipur. He had acted in over 100 plays and directed around 20 plays. Thiyam had also acted in many Manipuri films. He was popularly known as Commando Chinglen from the Shumang Leela Thawaina Punshigidamak. Not only in digital films, but he had also acted in Manipuri celluloid movies. He was conferred with the Iboyaima Shumang Leela Award in 2020 for his profound contribution in Shumang Leela. Wari Loidri, Khomlang Laman, Thawaina Punshigidamak, Sanagi Nga, Keishamthong Thoibi were some of the famous plays where he acted.

Career
From 1972 onwards, while studying at Imphal College, he joined theatre classes in Chorus Repertory Theatre, Aryan Theatre and Rupmahal Theatre under the guidance of renowned theatre personalities like Ratan Thiyam and Lokendra Arambam.

Chinglen Thiyam started his career in Shumang Leela playing antagonistic characters. Later, he became a popular comedian whom every Shumang Leela lovers looked up to. He was popular as Commando Chinglen for playing the role of an aggressive police in the play Thawaina Punshigidamak. He played a Maiba in the third installment of Maibido Maibado Mapuroibado and he himself directed the play. His portrayal of an orthodox Brahmin in the play Keishamthong Thoibi was well received by the audiences. The play was made into a movie by O. Gautam in 2008  and Thiyam played the same role in the film as well. Some of the Shumang Leela associations where he joined were Naharol Khongthang Artistes' Association, Sangai Artistes' Association and Iramdam Manipur Artistes' Association (IMAA). IMAA's 2020 play Nacha Lanjare Ima was his last Shumang Leela.

Thiyam was an approved artiste of All India Radio, Imphal. He had also acted in Manipuri films. To name a few, Meiree, Heinoujom Yumbal Tellanga Yahip, Keishamthong Thoibi and Meefu Leikai may be mentioned. In 1998 movie Meiree, he portrayed the role of Gogo Commando. He had starred in a 2019 music video titled Ayukkina Korou Oirambee directed by Rajen Leishangthem.

Accolades
Chinglen Thiyam was conferred with the Senior Fellowship 2015 in Shumang Leela by Manipur State Kala Akademi. He also won the Best Lyricist Award 2015 in the Manipur State Shumang Leela Festival organised by Manipur State Kala Akademi. In 2014, he received the Neta Irabot Leelaroi Lifetime Mana (Shumang Leela) at the MANIFA 2014 organised by Sahitya Seva Samiti, Kakching. He won the Iboyaima Shumang Leela Award in 2020.

Selected Shumang Leelas

 Hingbagi Mamal
 Thawaina Punshigidamak
 Khomlang Laman
 21st Century gee Kunti
 21st Century gee Kunti-2
 Phijigee Mani (21st Century gee Kunti-3)
 Keishamthong Thoibi
 Nongoubee
 Naitom Satpi
 Eyaithakki Thambal
 Mani Mangkhraba Manipur (Maibido Maibado Mapuroibado 3)
 Sanaleibakki Sanatombi
 Koklaroidaba Peepham
 Leikaigi Sambal
 Sanagi Nga
 Yukhal Marumda (Sanagi Nga 2)
 Haigat Lang (Sanagi Nga 3)
 Wari Loidri
 Ngaikhini (Wari Loidri 2)
 Nipal Suba Mapok (Wari Loidri 3)
 Nungshibagidamak
 Chakpa Makhao Ngambi
 Professor
 Suti Loidri
 Pakhang No. 1
 Kombeerei
 Huranbi Nungshibi
 Thawaigi Thawai
 Nungshibagi Machu
 Nacha Lanjare Ima

Selected filmography

External links

References

1950 births
2020 deaths
Indian male film actors
20th-century Indian male actors
Meitei people
People from Bishnupur district
Male actors from Manipur
Shumang Kumhei artists